Ozbekuy, also rendered as Ozbekuh or Osbak Kuh or Ozbagu or Ozbak Kuh or Usbeg Kuh, may refer to:
 Ozbekuy-e Jadid